Sheridan Whalen Miyamoto is an American forensic nurse practitioner and researcher. She is an Associate professor at Pennsylvania State University. In August 2020, Miyamoto was inducted as a Fellow of the American Academy of Nursing.

Early life and education
Miyamoto completed her Bachelor of Arts degree at the University of California, Davis and her Master's degree at Vanderbilt University. Following her master's degree, Miyamoto worked as a nurse practitioner in emergency response and pediatric sexual assault examiner.  She then returned to UC Davis for her Ph.D. in their Betty Irene Moore School of Nursing and accepted a 2013–15 Doris Duke Fellowship.

Career
While completing her fellowship, Miyamoto met Jennie Noll who directed Pennsylvania State University's (PSU) Network on Child Protection and Well-Being. She was subsequently recruited to become the Network's nursing specialist and charged with developing an undergraduate course for PSU's interdisciplinary minor in Child Maltreatment. As an assistant professor at PSU's College of Nursing, she oversaw the launch of the Sexual Assault Forensic Examination and Training (SAFE-T) Center, a telehealth program to train rural nurses in assault exams. She also led a one-year project to examine the incident rates and risk factors for commercial sexual exploitation of children in Pennsylvania.

In July 2020, Miyamoto was one of 11 nurse scientists accepted to the inaugural cohort of the Betty Irene Moore Fellowships for Nurse Leaders and Innovators. The fellowship program recognized early- to mid-career nursing scholars and innovators with a "high potential to accelerate leadership in nursing research, practice, education, policy and entrepreneurship." The following month, Miyamoto was inducted as a Fellow of the American Academy of Nursing.

References

External links

Living people
Date of birth missing (living people)
Place of birth missing (living people)
American women nurses
Sexual abuse victim advocates
University of California, Davis alumni
Vanderbilt University alumni
Pennsylvania State University faculty
Fellows of the American Academy of Nursing